Jungholz is a village in the district of Reutte in the Austrian state of Tyrol that is accessible only via Germany. The lack of a road connection to anywhere else in Austria led to Jungholz being included in the German customs area until Austria joined the EU in 1995. It also used the  instead of the Austrian schilling as currency until 2002, when the euro took over. Letters to Jungholz can be addressed with either a German or an Austrian postal code.

Quadripoint

Jungholz forms a pene-exclave of Austria that is connected to the rest of Austria by a single point, which is the summit of the mountain Sorgschrofen. As well as housing border post number 110 on the normal international border between Tyrol and Bavaria, a second border starts and, having gone round Jungholz, ends there. There are thus borders extending in four directions from the summit, called a quadripoint. Two Austrian (Tyrolean, Reutte) and two German (Bavarian, Oberallgäu) municipalities meet at that point, starting with Jungholz and continuing clockwise:
Jungholz (Austrian, north)
Pfronten (German, east)
Schattwald (Austrian, south)
Bad Hindelang (German, west)

History
On 24 June 1342, Hermann Häselin, a farmer from Wertach in Germany, sold the area to Heinz Lochpyler, an Austrian taxman from nearby Tannheim. The buyer had the area incorporated with his other possession of Tyrol. In the Bavarian–Austrian border treaty of 1844 Jungholz went to Austria. Its customs union with Germany dates to a Treaty signed in 1868.

See also

List of enclaves and exclaves
List of towns in Austria

References

External links

Jungholz's official website (in German only)

Cities and towns in Reutte District
Enclaves and exclaves
Austria–Germany border crossings